Rudolph Goclenius the Elder (born Rudolf Gockel or Göckel; 1 March 1547 – 8 June 1628) was a German scholastic philosopher. Gockel is often credited with coining the term "psychology" in 1590, though the term had been used by Marko Marulić at least 66 years earlier. Gockel had extensive backing, and made significant contributions to the field of ontology. He extended the development of many ideas from Aristotle. Several of Gockel's ideas were published and built upon by later philosophers.

Life
He was born in Korbach, Waldeck (now in Waldeck-Frankenberg, Hesse).

He attended the universities at the University of Erfurt, the University of Marburg and the University of Wittenberg, where he finished his studies with a M.A. in 1571. In the following years he directed the gymnasiums in his hometown Korbach (1573) and in Kassel (Michaelmas 1575). In 1581, Landgrave Wilhelm IV of Hesse-Kassel, who was a reputed astronomer, refused his wish to return to Korbach, but allowed him to be appointed professor at the Philipps University of Marburg, where he had the chairs of physics, logic, mathematics and ethics. He served as a counsellor to Wilhelm and his son Moritz. The latter sent him in 1618 to the Synod of Dort.

Although he popularized the term "psychology," his major contribution was to the field of ontology. As a follower of Aristotle's work, Gockel gave the philosophy a name and continued in Aristotle's way of thinking. The philosophical discipline of Ontology is thought to have been developed in the 17th century by Goclenius.

Goclenius became the subject of a satirical text by Johann Balthasar Schupp. According to Schupp, Goclenius said in his old age that his Analecta [Lichae 1598] was the best book of all he has ever written.

Jeremias Nicolai, a student at Korbach Stadtschule from Autumn 1574 onwards, brother of Philipp Nicolai, reported that Goclenius "immediately" wrote a poem about "fiery air phenomena" (feurige Lufterscheinungen) that were seen in the city on November 14, 1574. It was published in Marburg the same year. City historian Wolfgang Medding has conjectured that the phenomena which provided the inspiration for Goclenius' poem might have been an aurora, an assumption which is supported by historical data. Later, he treated auroras ("chasmata") in a Physics textbook of 1604.

Goclenius died of a stroke in Marburg on June 8, 1628. In his funeral speech on June 10, Wolfgang Loriseca called Goclenius a "leader of today's philosophers, Marburgian Plato, European light, Hessian immortal glory".

Family
Goclenius married his first wife, Margarethe, in 1570. Abraham Saur, a jurist in Marburg, recorded in his chronicle for the 10th of April:

From this marriage his oldest son, Rudolph Goclenius the Younger, or Rudolf Goclenius, Jr. was born who became a professor in Marburg and a celebrated mathematician. It is after Rudolph Goclenius, Jr., that the lunar crater is named. He also worked on cures against the plague. He became famous for his miraculous cure with the "weapon salve" or Powder of Sympathy. Other descendants were Theodor Christoph Goclenius (1602-1673, Medicine), Eduard Franz Goclenius (1643-1721, Law) and Reinhard Goclenius (1678-1726, Law).

Philosophical attitude
From his dispute with Wilhelm Adolph Scribonius of Marburg on the legality of the ordeal by water in witch trials, one can deduce that Goclenius was convinced on the existence of witchcraft and adhered to the "Hexenhammer".

His views reflected those of Aristotle. His philosophies belonged to a group called “Semiramists,” which was a group of Aristotelians who believed in advocating dialectic interpretation of Aristotle's learning, but also advocating the exposition of Ramism. While he was still a rector at Korbach Stadtschule Goclenius composed a scholarly poem on Ramus' death. In a letter written by Friedrich Beurhusius to Johann Thomas Freigius in September 1575, Goclenius was mentioned as a devotee to Ramus alongside other schoolmen such as Johann Lambach and Bernhard Copius.

Goclenius is reported to have said that Aristotle, Scaliger (whose Exercitationes he called his Bible), Zabarella, Schegk are all that is needed to fill up the bookstand of philosophers.

Works
In his "Philosophical Inquiries", published in 1599, Goclenius provides a synoptic table that subdivides the philosophical doctrines, or liberal arts, into special domains of knowledge. It is useful for the classification of his works to a certain point. He used the term ontology in his Lexicon philosophicum (1613) which was coined by Jacob Lorhard in his Ogdoas Scholastica (1606).

Psychology 

Goclenius’ major contributions also included publications which led to the term psychology. In two academic disputations presided by Goclenius at Marburg University in 1586 the word "psychology" appears as an adjective ("psychologicae"). His anthology Psychologia: hoc est, de hominis perfectione, animo, et in primis ortu hujus published in 1590 is the first book to contain the word "psychology" in the title. The Psychologia of 1590 (a second printing was issued in 1594) contains mostly excerpts from treatises written between 1579 and 1589. The book's full title translates to English as, "Psychology: that is, on the perfection of man, his mind, and especially its origin, the comments and discussions of certain theologians & philosophers of our time who are shown on the turned page." Here, the term psychology refers to both a subject of inquiry ("the perfection of man, his mind, and especially its origin") and the inquiry itself ("the comments and discussions of certain theologians & philosophers of our time"). In the 17th century, Goclenius' Psychologia was read and quoted by scholars like Robert Burton, Daniel Sennert and Jakob Thomasius. Goclenius himself returned to his Psychologia in a textbook on natural science of 1604 and in some philosophical disputations.

Logic 

Goclenius' crowning achievement is his original contribution made to term logic, called the Goclenian Sorites. In the words of the British logician Carveth Read:

"It is the shining merit of Goclenius to have restored the Premises of the Sorites to the usual order of Fig. I.: whereby he has raised to himself a monument more durable than brass, and secured indeed the very cheapest immortality.  How expensive, compared with this, was the method of the Ephesian incendiary!"

An example for the use of sorites in an argumentative context is presented by Goclenius in his "Dissertatio De Ortu Animi" which concludes the first edition of the Psychologia.

Contrary to Carveth Read's assessment, however, Dr. Rudolph Goclenius did not invent the Goclenian Sorites: St. Thomas Aquinas did:

"[A] second demonstration takes as its starting point the conclusion of a first demonstration, whose terms are understood to contain the middle term which was the starting point of the first demonstration. Thus the second demonstration will proceed from four terms the first from three only, the third from five, and the fourth from six; so that each demonstration adds one term. Thus it is clear that first demonstrations are included in subsequent ones, as when this first demonstration—every B is A, every C is B, therefore every C is A—is included in this demonstration—every C is A, every D is C, therefore every D is A; and this again is included in the demonstration whose conclusion is that every E is A, so that for this final conclusion there seems to be one syllogism composed of several syllogisms having several middle terms. This may be expressed thus: every B is A, every C is B, every D is C, every E is D, therefore every E is A."

Publications

Bibliographies of Goclenius' writings were prepared by F. W. Strieder and by F. J. Schmidt (see below). His list of publications include a large number of academic disputations. This is due to the statutes of Landgrave Philip I of January 14, 1564 which required professors at the University of Marburg to carry out weekly examinations. Goclenius lectured three hours a day: one pro lectione publica, one pro magistrandis and one pro baccalaureandis.

 Problemata logica, pars I 1589, pars II 1590; Pars I-V 1594 (reprint: Frankfurt: Minerva, 1967, in 5 voll.)
 Psychologia: hoc est, de hominis perfectione, animo, et in primis ortu hujus, commentationes ac disputationes quorundam theologorum & philosophorum nostrae aetatis, Marburg 1590; Marburg 1594; Marburg 1597 (revised edition).
 Oratio de natura sagarum in purgatione & examinatione per Frigidam aquis innatantium, Marburg 1584 (an oration held at a graduation ceremony on November 19, 1583; republished in Panegyrici Academiae Marpurgensis, Marburg 1590, pp. 190–203)
 Partitio dialectica, Frankfurt 1595 
 Isagoge in peripateticorum et scholasticorum primam philosopiam, quae dici consuevit metaphysica, 1598 (reprint: Hildesheim: Georg Olms, 1976)
 Institutionum logicarum de inventione liber unus, Marburg 1598 
  Oberursel 1600
 Appendix IIII. Dialogistica, Marburg 1602
 Physicae completae speculum, Frankfurt 1604
 Dilucidationes canonum philosophicorum, Lich 1604 
 Controversia logicae et philosophiae, ad praxin logicam directae, quibus praemissa sunt theoremata seu praecepta logica, Marburg 1604 
 Miscellaneorum Theologicorum Et Philosophicorum,  Marburg 1607;  Marburg 1608
 Conciliator philosophicus, 1609 (reprint: Hildesheim, Georg Olms, 1980)
 Lexicon philosophicum quo tanquam clave philosophiae fores aperiuntur, 1613 (reprint: Hildesheim: Georg Olms, 1980)
 Lexicon philosophicum Graecum, Marburg 1615 (reprint: Hildesheim: Georg Olms, 1980)

References

Further reading 
 Simone De Angelis, Zwischen generatio and creatio. Zum Problem der Genese der Seele um 1600 - Rudolph Goclenius, Julius Caesar Scaliger, Fortunio Liceti. In Lutz Dannenberg (Hrsg.), Zwischen christlicher Apologetik und methodologischem Atheismus : Wissenschaftsprozesse im Zeitraum von 1500 bis 1800, Berlin 2002, pp. 94–144
 Diana Kremer, "Von erkundigung und Prob der Zauberinnen durchs kalte Wasser". Wilhelm Adolph Scribonius aus Marburg und Rudolf Goclenius aus Korbach zur Rechtmäßigkeit der "Wasserprobe" im Rahmen der Hexenverfolgung, in: Geschichtsblätter für Waldeck, Bd. 84, 1996, pp. 141–168.
 Marco Lamanna, La nascita dell'ontologia nella metafisica di Rudolph Göckel (1547-1628), Hildesheim: Georg Olms, 2013.
 Paul Mengal, La naissance de la psychologie, Paris 2005
 Leonid I. Ragozin, Ψυχολογία and Psychology: Goclenius, Ramus, and Vultejus. In Voprosy filosofii, 2018, No. 2, pp. 102–111
 Martin Roebel, Humanistische Medizin und Kryptocalvinismus : Leben und medizinisches Werk des Wittenberger Medizinprofessors Caspar Peucer (1525 – 1602), Freiburg 2012
 Franz Joseph Schmidt, Materialien zur Bibliographie von Rudolph Goclenius sen. (1547-1628) und Rudolph Goclenius jun. (1572-1621), Hamm 1979
 Rudolf Schmitz, Die Naturwissenschaften an der Philipps-Universität Marburg 1517-1927, Marburg 1978, p. 15ff.
 Hermann Schüling, Bibliographie der psychologischen Literatur des 16. Jahrhunderts, Hildesheim 1967
 Gideon Stiening, Psychologie. In Barbara Bauer (Hrsg.), Melanchthon und die Marburger Professoren (1527-1627), Marburg 1999, pp. 315–344
 Friedrich Wilhelm Strieder, Grundlage zu einer hessischen Gelehrten und Schriftsteller Geschichte. Seit der Reformation bis auf gegenwärtige Zeiten, Bd. 4, Göttingen 1784, pp. 428–487; Bd. 9, Cassel 1794, p. 381; Bd. 13, Cassel 1802, pp. 341–343.
 Fernando Vidal, The Sciences of the Soul : The Early Modern Origins of Psychology, Chicago 2011

External links 
 Notes on the development of Ontology from Suarez to Kant
 The Birth of Ontology. A selection of Ontologists from 1560 to 1770
Russian translations by Leonid I. Ragozin (with English abstracts):
 Goclenius R. (Ed.) (2018). Ψυχολογια: that is, on human perfection, on the spirit, and first and foremost on its origin ... Metodologiâ i istoriâ psihologii. Iss. 2. P. 143–149.
 Vultejus H. (2018). The diatribe on the man’s philosophical perfection. Metodologiâ i istoriâ psihologii. Iss. 4. P. 111–140.

1547 births
1628 deaths
People from Korbach
German philosophers
German lexicographers
Participants in the Synod of Dort
People from Waldeck (state)
16th-century German writers
16th-century German male writers
17th-century German writers
16th-century philosophers
17th-century philosophers
German male non-fiction writers
17th-century German male writers